Ursula Justin (born 1927) is a German stage and film actress. She starred in six films during the 1950s, all of them directed by her husband Géza von Cziffra.

Filmography
 Dancing Stars (1952)
 The Singing Hotel (1953)
 The Flower of Hawaii (1953)
 Dancing in the Sun (1954)
 Money from the Air (1954)
 Bandits of the Autobahn (1955)

References

Bibliography
 Goble, Alan. The Complete Index to Literary Sources in Film. Walter de Gruyter, 1999.

External links

1927 births
Possibly living people
German film actresses
German stage actresses
People from Märkischer Kreis